Wercklea intermedia is a species of plant in the family Malvaceae. It is endemic to Ecuador.  Its natural habitat is subtropical or tropical moist lowland forests.

References

intermedia
Endemic flora of Ecuador
Vulnerable plants
Taxonomy articles created by Polbot